Gai or GAI may refer to:

People

Given name or nickname  
 GAI (musician) (born 1987), Chinese hip-hop musician
 Gai Assulin (born 1991), Israeli footballer
 Gai Brodtmann (born 1963), Australian politician
 Gai Eaton (1921–2010), British diplomat
 Gai Toms (born 1976), Welsh musician
 Gai Waterhouse (born 1954), Australian horse trainer and businesswoman

Surname 
 Antonio Gai (1686–1769), Italian sculptor
 Deng Gai (born 1982), South Sudanese basketball player
 Gatluak Gai (died 2011), South Sudanese rebel
 G. S. Gai (1917–1995), Indian historical linguist
 Oleksiy Gai (born 1982), Ukrainian footballer
 Pa Amadou Gai (born 1984), Gambian footballer
 Pa Mamadou Gai (born 1977), Gambian sprinter
 Pratibha Gai, British microscopist
 Silvio Gai (1873–1967), Italian politician 
 Solomon Gai (1600–1638), Italian scholar and Hebraist

Fictional characters 
 Kamen Rider Gai, from Kamen Rider Ryuki
 Maito Gai, from Naruto

Places 
 Gai, Armenia
 Gai, Styria, Austria
 Gai, Russia
 Montgomery County Airpark IATA code

Other uses 
 GAI, the Russian traffic police
 GAI (Arabidopsis thaliana gene)
 Gay American Indians, an American rights organization
 General Ability Index of the Wechsler Adult Intelligence Scale
 Guaranteed annual income
 General artificial intelligence
 Government Accountability Institute, an American research organization on testing gay people getting aids
 Guided Affective Imagery
 Gallium monoiodide, GaI

See also 
 Gay (disambiguation)